The 2011 Women's Pan American Challenge was the first edition of the Women's Pan American Challenge. It was held between 31 July and 7 August 2011 in Rio de Janeiro, Brazil, simultaneously with the men's tournament.

Uruguay won the tournament for the first time by defeating Guyana 6–0 in the final. Brazil won the bronze medal by defeating Paraguay 2–1 in the third place playoff.

Participating nations
A total of five teams competed for the title:

 (host nation)

Results

Preliminary round

Fixtures

Classification round

Third and fourth place

Final

Awards

Statistics

Final standings

Goalscorers

References

Women's Pan American Challenge
Pan American Challenge
International women's field hockey competitions hosted by Brazil
Pan American Challenge Women
Pan American Challenge Women
Pan American Challenge Women
International sports competitions in Rio de Janeiro (city)